is a Japanese professional footballer who plays as a goalkeeper for  club Albirex Niigata.

Club career
After attending Waseda University, Kojima joined Oita Trinita in October 2018 for the 2019 season.
After playing two games for Oita, he moved on loan to Albirex Niigata in the J2 League and played there for two seasons before making the move a permanent one for the 2022 season. 
Kojima helped Albirex to become J2 League champions with 18 clean sheets in 42 matches and was also named in the J2 League's Best XI.

International career
On May 24, 2019, Kojima has been called by Japan's head coach Hajime Moriyasu to feature in the Copa América played in Brazil.

Club statistics
.

Honours

 Albirex Niigata
J2 League : 2022

 Individual
J2 League Best XI: 2022

References

External links
 
 
 Profile at Oita Trinita
 
 
 

1997 births
Living people
People from Toyota, Aichi
Association football people from Aichi Prefecture
Japanese footballers
Japan youth international footballers
J1 League players
J2 League players
Nagoya Grampus players
Oita Trinita players
Albirex Niigata players
Association football goalkeepers
Medalists at the 2018 Asian Games
Footballers at the 2018 Asian Games
Asian Games medalists in football
Asian Games silver medalists for Japan